Titan A.E. is a 2000 American animated science fiction film directed by Don Bluth and Gary Goldman, and starring Matt Damon, Bill Pullman, John Leguizamo, Nathan Lane, Janeane Garofalo and Drew Barrymore. Its title refers to the spacecraft central to the plot with A.E. meaning "After Earth". The animation of the film combines 2D traditional hand-drawn animation with the extensive use of computer-generated imagery.

The film tells the story of a young man who receives a mission to save humanity and protect the giant ship that can create a new planet, after a hostile alien species destroyed Earth. Along the way, he joins up with a ship's crew and their captain, who help him find the ship before the aliens can destroy it.

The third and final project produced by Fox Animation Studios, the film was theatrically released on June 16, 2000 by 20th Century Fox in the United States. The film received mixed reviews from critics and made a loss at the box office.

Plot

In 3028, a groundbreaking scientific project known as "The Titan Project" incurs the wrath of the Drej, a hostile race of aliens with bodies of pure energy, who fear that it will allow humans to challenge them. Determined to wipe out humanity, the Drej destroy Earth in a massive attack, forcing the surviving humans to evacuate and flee into space. During the evacuation of Earth, Professor Sam Tucker—head researcher on the Titan Project—leaves his young son Cale in the care of his alien friend Tek as he flees Earth in the spaceship Titan. Before he leaves, he gives Cale a gold ring, promising him that there will be hope for humanity as long as he wears it.

Fifteen years later, following his father's death, with humanity on the verge of extinction following the destruction of their planet, a jaded and cynical Cale works in the salvage yard of space station Tau 14. Ex-military officer Joseph Korso, a former friend and confidant of Cale's father, tracks Cale down and reveals that the location of the Titan is encoded in his ring, allowing him to find the long-missing ship by following a holographic map in the palm of his hand. Korso invites Cale to join the crew of his spaceship Valkyrie as they seek the Titan. Accepting Korso's offer, Cale befriends Korso's pilot Akima Kunimoto and his three alien crew members: first mate Preed, weapons officer Stith, and scientist Gune.
	
After Cale and Korso escape Tau 14 with the Drej in pursuit, Cale's map leads the crew of the Valkyrie to the planet Sesharrim, where the alien Gaoul help them interpret the map, revealing that the Titan is hidden in the Andali Nebula. On Sesharrim, Drej fighters abduct Cale and Akima and copy the map. Akima is rescued by the crew after being jettisoned by the Drej Queen, while Cale escapes the Drej mothership in a stolen fighter and makes his way back to the Valkyrie. The map changes to reveal the Titans hiding place within the Andali Nebula: the ice rings of Tigrin, a labyrinthine asteroid field.

While resupplying at human space station New Bangkok, Cale and Akima discover that Korso and Preed are planning to sell the Titans location to the Drej. Cale and Akima manage to escape the Valkyrie, but are left stranded on New Bangkok when Korso and the remaining crew leave for the Titan. Determined to beat Korso to the Titan, they fix up a dilapidated spaceship with help from the station's inhabitants.

Cale and Akima navigate the ice rings of Tigrin and dock with the Titan before the Valkyrie arrives. They discover DNA of animals onboard and a pre-recorded holographic message left by Cale's father explaining that the ship was designed to create planets, but the ship's power cells were drained in the escape from Earth, and lack the energy necessary to create a planet. After Korso and Preed arrive, Preed reveals that he has betrayed Korso and made his own deal with the Drej. Korso kills Preed by snapping his neck, and Korso seemingly falls to his death in a fight with Cale.

As the Drej attack the Titan, Cale and Akima fight them off with the help of Stith and Gune. During the battle, Cale realizes that he may be able to recharge the Titan by converting its systems to use the Drej's bodies of pure energy, but a circuit breaker stalls before he can complete the process. Korso, who survived his fall, has a change of heart after overhearing Cale's plan and sacrifices his life to repair the circuit breaker, while Cale triggers the Titans systems, killing the Drej as the Titan absorbs their mothership.

Cale and Akima embrace in the rain on the newly created human homeworld, and ships filled with human colonists arrive to start a new life.

Cast
 Matt Damon as Cale Tucker, a yard-salvager who carries the map to Titan in his ring.
 Alex D. Linz as Young Cale Tucker
 Bill Pullman as Captain Joseph Korso, former soldier and captain of the Valkyrie.
 John Leguizamo as Gune, an amphibian-like Grepoan and Korso's chief scientist.
 Nathan Lane as Preedex "Preed" Yoa, a fruit bat-like Akrennian and Korso's first mate.
 Janeane Garofalo as Stith, a kangaroo-like Sogowan and munitions officer of the Valkyrie.
 Drew Barrymore as Akima Kunimoto, pilot of the Valkyrie and Cale's love interest.
 Ron Perlman as Professor Sam Tucker, Cale's father who helped develop Project Titan.
 Tone Lōc as Tek, Sam Tucker's blind alien friend who raises Cale after Sam left.
 Jim Breuer as the Cook, a cockroach-like alien who works at Tau 14.
 Christopher Scarabosio as the Drej Queen who fears the potential threat of humans and intends to destroy them.
 Jim Cummings as Chowquin, Cale's overseer at the salvage yard.
 Charles Rocket as Firrikash, an alien salvage yard worker who bullies Cale.
 Charles Rocket also voices a Slave Trader Guard who surprises Preed with his intelligence.
 Ken Hudson Campbell (credited as Ken Campbell) as Po, an alien salvage yard worker who bullies Cale.
 Tsai Chin as Old Woman
 Crystal Scales as Drifter Girl
 David Lander as the Mayor of New Bangkok
 Roger L. Jackson as the first alien

Production

Development
In development at 20th Century Fox since 1998, Titan A.E. was originally going to be a live-action film. The script had been passed around to various writers such as Ben Edlund, Joss Whedon and Art Vitello. After $30 million had been spent in the film's early development with no progress, Art Vitello was sacked. Then-chairman of 20th Century Fox Bill Mechanic then gave the script to Fox Animation Studios creative heads Don Bluth and Gary Goldman, who were fresh from the success of their recent film Anastasia (1997). Mechanic had no scripts for Fox Animation Studios to work on and was faced with the choice of laying off the animation staff unless they took Titan A.E. Despite their inexperience with the science fiction genre, Bluth and Goldman took the script regardless.

Fox Animation Studios was given a production budget of $75 million and 19 months to make the film. Unlike Bluth and Goldman's previous films, the animation in Titan A.E. is predominantly computer-generated while the main characters and several backgrounds were traditionally animated. Many of the scenes were enacted by the animation staff using handbuilt props before being captured by a computer. Many scenes and backgrounds were painted by concept artist Paul Cheng, who had worked on Anastasia and its direct-to-video spin-off Bartok the Magnificent (1999). Much like Anastasia, the storytelling and tone in Titan A.E. is much darker and edgier than Bluth and Goldman's previous films with the film being regularly compared to Japanese anime. Although Bluth and Goldman denied any influence by anime, they have acknowledged the comparison.

During production of Titan A.E., Fox Animation Studios suffered a number of cutbacks which ultimately led to its closure in 2000. Over 300 animation staff were laid off from the studio in 1999 and as a result, much of the film's animation was outsourced to a number of independent companies. Several scenes were contracted to David Paul Dozoretz's POVDE group; the "Wake Angels" scene was animated by Reality Check Studios (their first feature film work) while the film's "Genesis" scene was animated by Blue Sky Studios, who would later go on to making 20th Century Fox's Ice Age and Rio film franchises as well as Horton Hears a Who! (2008) and The Peanuts Movie (2015). Under pressure from executives, Bill Mechanic was dismissed from 20th Century Fox prior to Titan A.E.s release eventuating in the closure of Fox Animation Studios on June 26, 2000, ten days after the film's release. All these events stunted the film's promotion and distribution.

Casting
On November 24, 1997, Matt Damon joined the cast of the film along with Bill Pullman, Drew Barrymore, Nathan Lane, Jim Breuer, Janeane Garofalo and Lena Olin. Later, John Leguizamo joined the cast.

Music

Soundtrack

The soundtrack to Titan A.E. was released on audio cassette and CD by Capitol/EMI Records on June 6, 2000 and featured 11 tracks by various contemporary rock bands, including Lit, Powerman 5000, Electrasy, Fun Lovin' Criminals, The Urge, Texas, Bliss 66, Jamiroquai, Splashdown, The Wailing Souls and Luscious Jackson.

Creed's song "Higher" was played in many of the theatrical trailers for Titan A.E., but the song did not appear either on the soundtrack or in the movie itself.

Score

Titan A.E.s score was composed and conducted by Graeme Revell. Although an official album containing the movie's underscore was not originally released alongside the film, it was eventually made available for the first time on October 23, 2014 by La-La Land Records as a limited edition CD of 1,500 copies. The soundtrack contains 32 tracks and music cues, most of what Revell composed for the film, and includes two bonus tracks: an orchestra-only version of "Creation" and an alternative version of "Prologue" with a different opening.

Release

Digital screening
Titan A.E. became the first major motion picture to be screened in end-to-end digital cinema. On June 6, 2000, ten days before the film was released, at the SuperComm 2000 trade show, the movie was projected simultaneously at the trade show in Atlanta, Georgia as well as a screen in Los Angeles, California. It was sent to both screens from the 20th Century Fox production facilities in Los Angeles via a VPN.

Home media
Titan A.E. was released on VHS and a THX certified "Special Edition" DVD on November 7, 2000 by 20th Century Fox Home Entertainment, which contains extras such as a commentary track by Don Bluth and Gary Goldman, a "Quest for Titan" featurette, deleted scenes, web links, and a music video for Lit's "Over My Head". The region 1 North American version also comes with an exclusive DTS English audio track in addition to Dolby Digital 5.1 featured in most international releases. Chris Carle of IGN rated the DVD an 8 out of 10, calling the movie "thrilling... with some obvious plot and character flaws" but called the video itself "a fully-packed disc which looks and sounds great" and "for animation and sci-fi fans, it's a must-have".

Reception

Box office
Titan A.E. earned $9,376,845 during its opening weekend with an average of $3,430 from 2,734 theaters, ranking in fifth place behind Shaft, Gone in 60 Seconds, 20th Century Fox's own Big Momma's House and Mission: Impossible 2. The film then lost 60% of its audience in its second weekend, dropping to eighth place, with a gross of $3,735,300 for an average of $1,346 from 2,775 theaters. The film ended up grossing only $36,754,634 worldwide ($22,753,426 in the United States and Canada, and $14,001,208 in international markets). The film's budget is estimated at between $75 million and $90 million. According to Chris Meledandri, the supervisor of the film, Titan A.E. lost $100 million for 20th Century Fox.

Critical response
On Rotten Tomatoes, the film has an approval rating of 50% based on 103 reviews with an average rating of 5.70/10. The site's consensus reads: "Great visuals, but the story feels like a cut-and-paste job of other sci-fi movies". On Metacritic the film has a score of 48 out of 100 based on 30 reviews, indicating "mixed or average reviews". Audiences polled by CinemaScore gave the film an average grade of "A−" on an A+ to F scale.

Roger Ebert gave the film 3.5 stars out of 4, praising it for its "rousing story", "largeness of spirit" and "lush galactic visuals [which] are beautiful in the same way photos by the Hubble Space Telescope are beautiful". He cited the Ice Rings sequence as "a perfect examine (sic) of what animation can do and live-action cannot".

Accolades
Titan A.E. won a Golden Reel Award for "Best Sound Editing for an Animated Feature", and was nominated by the same organization for "Best Sound Editing for Music in Animation", and a Satellite Award for "Best Motion Picture, Animated or Mixed Media", losing both to Chicken Run. The film was also nominated for three Annie Awards, including "Outstanding Achievement in An Animated Theatrical Feature", "Effects Animation", and "Production Design" which it lost to Toy Story 2 and Fantasia 2000, respectively, and was nominated for Best Science Fiction Film at 27th Saturn Awards, but lost to X-Men, another film from 20th Century Fox. Drew Barrymore was nominated for "Best Voice-Over Performance" by the Online Film & Television Association for her role as Akima, but was beaten by Eartha Kitt from The Emperor's New Groove.

Cancelled video game
A video game adaptation by Blitz Games was planned to be released for the PlayStation and PC in Fall 2000 in North America, following the film's summer release (even receiving a mention at the end of the credits). Development on both platforms had begun in March 1999 under the film's original title Planet Ice, and an early playable version was showcased at the 2000 Electronic Entertainment Expo in Los Angeles. In July 2000, a spokesman from the game's publisher Fox Interactive, announced that development on the title had been halted largely due to the film's poor box office performance which was "only one of many different factors" that led to its cancellation.

Novels
To tie-in with the film, two prequel novels written by Kevin J. Anderson and Rebecca Moesta were released on February 10, 2000 by Ace Books, the same day the official novelization of the film written by Steve and Dal Perry was released. A Dark Horse Comics comic series focusing on the character Sam was also released in May 2000.

 Titan A.E.: Cale's Story – The adventures of Cale, ending with the beginning of the film. The book chronicles Cale growing up on Vusstra (Tek's home planet) for ten years and having to move to a different place every time the Drej attack. It also reveals how Cale became resentful of his father's disappearance and how he came to despise "drifter colonies".
 Titan A.E.: Akima's Story – The adventures of Akima, ending with the beginning of the film. The book chronicles Akima's life aboard drifter colonies and also reveals where she learned her karate skills, her friendship with Stith and her reason to find the Titan.
 Titan A.E.: Sam's Story – A three-issue comic book series telling the story of Sam Tucker, his crew and their quest to hide the Titan.

See also
 List of films featuring space stations
 List of 20th Century Fox theatrical animated features
 List of American films of 2000

References

External links

 
  
 

2000 films
2000 animated films
2000 science fiction films
2000s American animated films
2000s children's animated films
Animated science fiction films
Fictional-language films
Animated films about extraterrestrial life
Films adapted into comics
Films directed by Don Bluth
Films directed by Gary Goldman
Films produced by Don Bluth and Gary Goldman
Films produced by David Kirschner
Films scored by Graeme Revell
Films set in the 31st century
Films set in outer space
Animated films set in the future
Films set on fictional planets
Films set on spacecraft
Films with screenplays by John August
Films with screenplays by Joss Whedon
Animated post-apocalyptic films
American dystopian films
20th Century Fox films
20th Century Fox animated films
20th Century Fox Animation films
Fox Animation Studios films
2000s English-language films